Hannah Davis may refer to:

 Hannah Davis (filmmaker), British filmmaker and co-founder of Mansion Pictures
 Hannah Davis (kayaker) (born 1985), Australian Olympic bronze medalist
 Hannah Davis (model) (born 1990), American model, now Hannah Jeter
 Hannah Lux Davis (born 1986), music video director

See also
 Hannah Davison (born 1997), American soccer player